Milbert E.S. McKenzie (born April 29, 1949), who goes by the stage name Doc McKenzie, is an American gospel musician. He started his music career, in 1990, with six album releases, that was released by Atlanta International Records, Savoy Records, and Meltone Records. Milbert released three albums of note, Ride with Jesus in 1996 with First Lite Records, 1998's Live again with First Lite, and 2009's Renewed with Ophir Records, which all of these albums charted on the Billboard magazine charts, exclusively on the Gospel Albums chart.

Early life
Milbert was born on April 29, 1949 in Olanta, South Carolina, the son of Leroy and Cora McKenzie, who were farmers. The family went to church at St. Mark's Holiness Church that is located in Lake City, South Carolina. His pastor at the time, Bishop, R. C. Eaddy, gave him his moniker "Doc" because he could fix anything. He started leading his church choir at the age of six. The Hi-Lites got started by his sister Beronzy McKenzie, and his cousin, Handy McFadden, and they relocated to Paterson, New Jersey, for a time during the 1960s and 1970s, moving back home in the mid-1980s to begin their musical recording careers.

Music career
Milbert began his recording music career in 1990, with the release of six albums by three labels, Atlanta International Records, Savoy Records, and Meltone Records. He released, Ride with Jesus, on October 22, 1996 with First Lite Records, and this was the breakthrough release on the Billboard magazine Gospel Albums chart at No. 28. The musician release, Live, on September 15, 1998 by First Lite Records, and this charted on the aforementioned chart at No. 21. His next album to chart, Renewed, was released by Ophir Records on September 1, 2009, and this placed at No. 14 on the Gospel Albums chart.

Discography

References

External links
 Official website
 Cross Rhythms Profile

1949 births
Living people
African-American songwriters
African-American Christians
Musicians from New Jersey
Musicians from South Carolina
Songwriters from New Jersey
Songwriters from South Carolina
People from Florence County, South Carolina
21st-century African-American people
20th-century African-American people